This is the list of Commanders of the Academia Militar das Agulhas Negras. The list includes the Commanders of the schools prior to the AMAN that were located in Rio de Janeiro. Since its installation in Resende, which occurred in 1944, AMAN had 43 effective Commanders.

Academia Real Militar (1811-1822)

Imperial Academia Militar (1823-1831)

Academia Militar da Corte (1832-1838)

Escola Militar (1839-1857)

Escola de Aplicação do Exército (1855-1858)

Escola Central (1858-1866)

Escola Militar (1860-1879)

Escola Militar da Corte (1881-1888)

Escola Militar da Capital Federal (1889-1897)

Escola Militar do Brasil (1898-1904)

Escola de Guerra (1906-1911)

Escola Militar do Realengo (1912-1944)

Escola Militar de Resende (1944-1951)

Academia Militar das Agulhas Negras (1951-present)

See also
 Brazilian Army
 Academia Militar das Agulhas Negras
 Escola de Comando e Estado-Maior do Exército (Brazil)
 List of Commanders of the Escola de Comando e Estado-Maior do Exército (Brazil)
 Preparatory School of the Brazilian Army (Escola Preparatória de Cadetes do Exército)

External links
 Academia Militar das Agulhas Negras web page

Bibliography
 Bento, Cláudio Moreira. "Os 60 anos da Academia Militar das Agulhas Negras em Resende – RJ"
 Braga, Gustavo Lisboa. "Da Casa do Trem à AMAN"

Brazilian military personnel
Military academies
Undergraduate military academies of Brazil